Sangsarud (also Romanized as Sangsarūd; also known as Sang Sar Rūd) is a village in Siyarastaq Yeylaq Rural District, Rahimabad District, Rudsar County, Gilan Province, Iran. At the 2006 census, its population was 8, in 4 families.

References 

Populated places in Rudsar County